Power pooling is used to balance electrical load over a larger network (electrical grid) than a single utility.  It is a mechanism for interchange of power between two and more utilities which provide or generate electricity For exchange of power between two utilities there is an interchange agreement which is signed by them, but signing up an interchange agreement between each pair of utilities within a system can be a difficult task where several large utilities are interconnected. Thus, it is more advantageous to form a power pool with a single agreement that all join. That agreement provides established terms and conditions for pool members and is generally more complex than a bilateral agreement.

In one model, the power pool, formed by the utilities, has a control dispatch office from where the pool is administered. All the tasks regarding interchange of power and the settlement of disputes are assigned to the pool administrator.

The formation of power pools provide the following potential advantages:
Decrease in operating costs
Saving in reserve capacity requirements
Help from pool in unit commitment
Minimization of costs of maintenance scheduling
More reliable operation

The formation of a power pool is associated with a number of problems and constraints. These include:
Pool agreement may be very complex
Costs associated with establishing central dispatch office and the needed communication and computational facilities
The opposition of pool members to give up their rights to engage in independent transactions outside the pool.
The complexity towards dealing with regulatory authorities, if pool operates in more than one state.
The effort by each member of the pool to maximize its savings.

Power pooling is very important for extending energy control over a large area served by multiple utilities.

See also
 Wheeling (electric power transmission)

Notes

Further reading
  Master's Thesis

Pooling